Mind Funk is the debut studio album by American rock band Mind Funk. It was released on March 12, 1991 by Epic Records.

Critical reception
The Encyclopedia of Popular Music called the album "aggressive and confident". Trouser Press called it "a Spinal Tapped lunk-o-metal platter". Spin wrote that the album is "chock-full of eclectic musical styles merged with a liberal dose of vocalist Pat Dubar's arresting lyrics."

In a retrospective article, Decibel called Mind Funk "smart alt-metal, the kind that most of us loved back in 1991 and 1992."

Track listing
All songs written and arranged by Mind Funk.
 "Sugar Ain't So Sweet" – 4:44
 "Ride & Drive" – 3:43
 "Bring It On" – 4:53
 "Big House Burning" – 4:28
 "Fire" – 6:36
 "Blood Runs Red" – 4:03
 "Sister Blue" – 5:58
 "Woke Up This Morning" – 5:15
 "Innocence" – 4:03
 "Touch You" – 4:42

Personnel
 Pat Dubar – lead vocals
 Louis Svitek – lead guitar
 Jason Coppola – rhythm guitar, backing vocals
 John Monte – bass, backing vocals
 Reed St. Mark – drums
 Jan Eliasson – producer

References 

Mind Funk albums
1991 debut albums
Funk metal albums